Greek National Road 86 is a national highway of Greece. It connects the Greek National Road 39 near Krokees with Monemvasia, via Skala and Molaoi.

86
Roads in Peloponnese (region)